Reggie Walker (born April 22, 1996) is an American football linebacker for the Houston Gamblers of the United States Football League (USFL). He was signed by the Arizona Cardinals as an undrafted free agent in 2020 following his college football career with the Kansas State Wildcats.

Professional career

Arizona Cardinals 
Walker signed with the Arizona Cardinals as an undrafted free agent following the 2020 NFL Draft on April 27, 2020. He was waived during final roster cuts on September 5, 2020, and signed to the team's practice squad the next day. He was elevated to the active roster on October 19 for the team's week 6 game against the Dallas Cowboys, and reverted to the practice squad after the game. He was signed to the active roster on November 19, 2020. He was waived on November 21 and re-signed to the practice squad three days later. He signed a reserve/future contract on January 5, 2021. On August 31, 2021, Walker was waived by the Cardinals.

Edmonton Elks 
On May 15, 2022, Walker signed with the Edmonton Elks of the Canadian Football League (CFL). He was placed on the suspended list by the team on May 24, and released on July 29.

Houston Gamblers
Walker signed with the Houston Gamblers of the United States Football League (USFL) on September 17, 2022.

References

External links
Arizona Cardinals bio
Kansas State Wildcats football bio

1996 births
Living people
People from Ponchatoula, Louisiana
Players of American football from Louisiana
American football linebackers
Kansas State Wildcats football players
Arizona Cardinals players
Edmonton Elks players
Houston Gamblers (2022) players